David Jardine was a Scottish footballer. He played for English clubs Bootle, Nelson, and Everton, with whom he won the Football League in 1890-91. He also played for Welsh club Wrexham

Sources
Profile on evertonfc.com
Profile on wrexhamafcarchive.co.uk

References

Bootle F.C. (1879) players
Everton F.C. players
Nelson F.C. players
Wrexham A.F.C. players
English Football League players
1867 births
People from Lockerbie
Year of death missing
Association football goalkeepers
Scottish footballers